Gazelli Group Ltd., created in 1999, is a family-owned cosmetics manufacturing company located in Baku, Azerbaijan. Gazelli Group has created numerous brands that use ingredients found only in Azerbaijan and include an aspect of traditional art, poetry and culture.

The name of the company is derived from the word “gazel” – the Near and Middle Eastern form of poetry praising beauty, youth and love.

Formation

Doctor Zarifa Hamzayeva, the founder and president of the company, was born in Baku. After qualifying as a doctor from the University of Medicine, Baku, she worked for more than 15 years in the field of practical science and research. Dr. Hamzayeva has published more than 60 scientific papers and holds six patents. After studying the use and benefits of natural ingredients in cosmetic formulations she launched Gazelli in 1999, working to combine traditional recipes with advanced technology.

Awards

Gazelli has taken part in numerous international cosmetic exhibitions and received the following national and international awards for quality and standards of production:
 SIMURG (2002)
 UGUR (2005)

Manufacturing

In 1999 Dr Hamzayeva opened the Gazelli laboratory and factory. The factory is located on the outskirts of Azerbaijan’s capital, Baku. By 2006 the factory had expanded to over 10,000m2 of production space and is now capable of producing a minimum of 1 million units per month. There are now many different brands created by Gazelli Group. Gazelli has spread to cover other regions around the world. They now distribute to Russia, Turkey, Georgia and Ukraine and launched in Urban Retreat, Harrods, in September 2011. Since 2021 the brand sells its products in Pakistan as well.

References

External links 
 

Cosmetics companies of Azerbaijan
Companies based in Baku
Companies established in 1999
Azerbaijani brands
1999 establishments in Azerbaijan